Nikolay Arkadevich Skorobogatov (December 19, 1923, Vyazma, Vyazemsky Uyezd, Smolensk Governorate — June 10, 1987, Moscow) was a Soviet film and theater actor.

Biography 
Born in the family of the railway. After graduating from high school, he was admitted to the secondary structure of an actor Viazemsky Drama Theater, where he worked until July 1941. Also in July 1941, the family traveled to Skorobogatov city of Stalingrad, where Nicholay became Stalingrad Spectators actor, while working as a storekeeper at a military warehouse.

In March 1942, he went to the front, where he fought as an arrow Airborne Regiment.

Demobilized in 1945, right in the military uniform came to enter the acting department Mikhail Shchepkin Higher Theatre School.

After graduation in 1949 he was accepted into the troupe of Moscow Satire Theatre, where he played until 1952.

In October 1952 he was sent to Germany to work in the Second Drama Theater Group of Soviet Forces. After returning from Germany in October 1956, one year was in the company of film actor Theatre-studio.

In July 1957, he was accepted into the Moscow theater comedy tour, which worked for ten years.

In October 1967, invited to the Lenkom Theatre, where he served until his death.

In the last years of his life Nikolai Skorobogatov developed kidney disease, which was the cause of death of the actor.

He was buried in Moscow at the Vagankovo Cemetery (station number 2).

Awards
Honored Artist of the RSFSR (1977).
 Order of the Patriotic War second degree (1985).
Vasilyev Brothers State Prize of the RSFSR (1985).

Selected filmography
1951 — Sport Honor as listener
 1967 — Blasted Hell as Lifanov
 1968 — The Secret Agent's Blunder as judge
 1969 — Village Detective as Ivan Ivanovich
 1973 — Investigation Held by ZnaToKi  as Ivan Demin
 1976 — The Twelve Chairs as Tikhon, janitor
 1979 — Siberiade as Ermolai
 1982 — Stopped Train as  Pavel Sergeyevich Golovanov, head of Custody
   1983  — Vassa as Brother
 1983 — Yeralash as labor teacher
 1984 — TASS Is Authorized to Declare... as  Arkhipkin
 1984 — Formula of Love as Stepan

References

External links

1923 births
1987 deaths
People from Vyazma
People from Vyazemsky Uyezd
Russian male film actors
Russian male stage actors
Soviet male film actors
Soviet male stage actors
20th-century Russian male actors
Russian people of World War II
Honored Artists of the RSFSR
Recipients of the Vasilyev Brothers State Prize of the RSFSR
Burials at Vagankovo Cemetery